The Charles Lynch Award is an annual award presented to a Canadian journalist in recognition of outstanding coverage of national issues as selected by their colleagues in the Canadian Parliamentary Press Gallery. The award is presented each year at the Parliamentary Press Gallery Dinner.

The annual award was established in 1997 to honour the legendary Canadian journalist, author and World War II correspondent Charles Lynch.

Formerly handed out under the auspices of the National Press Club of Canada, the Charles Lynch Award is now administered by the Press Gallery itself. Rather than singling out any one achievement, the award is intended to recognize a recipient's overall reputation and respect according to their peers.

Charles Lynch Award Recipients 
 2019 Chantal Hébert (Toronto Star) 
 2018 Manon Corneiller (Le Devoir)
2017 Dean Beeby (CBC News) 
2016 Joel-Denis Bellavance (La Presse) 
2015 Jennifer Ditchburn (Canadian Press) 
2014 Robert Fife (CTV News) - Presented by Rob Russo and Don Newman.
2013 No Parliamentary Press Gallery Dinner was held in 2013.
2012 Daniel Leblanc (The Globe and Mail) 
2011 Susan Delacourt (Toronto Star) - Presented by Rob Russo and Don Newman.
2010 Rob Russo (Canadian Press) - Presented by Don Newman.
2009 Juliet O'Neill (Postmedia News)
2008 Not Awarded
2007 Not Awarded
2006 Jeffrey Simpson (The Globe and Mail)
2005 James Travers (Toronto Star)
2004 Not Awarded
2003 Susan Murray (CBC News)
2002 Craig Oliver (CTV News)
2001 Not Awarded
2000 Not Awarded
1999 Daniel L'Heureux (Radio-Canada)
1998 Hugh Winsor (The Globe and Mail)
1997 Don Newman (CBC Newsworld)

External links 
National Press Club of Canada
Canadian Parliamentary Press Gallery

References 

Canadian journalism awards